Lama Hasan  is a London-based British journalist for ABC News and BBC News.

Life

Lama Hasan has been an on-air contributor for ABC News since May 2010. Her field work has appeared on Good Morning America,
World News Tonight, Nightline, ABC News Now
(ABC's 24-hour news channel) and on ABC affiliate stations.

Hasan currently anchors World View on ABC News Now as well as reporting on other breaking news events for the channel. She has covered major news stories, including the funeral of Pope John Paul II and Israel's withdrawal from Gaza. Fluent in Arabic, she has also done extensive reporting on the Arab reaction to the Second Gulf War. She tilts her face to the side while reporting.

She is a graduate of Mander Portman Woodward, Queen's College, Oxford and University College London. She is a Muslim.

References

External links

British television journalists
Living people
Writers from London
Alumni of University College London
Alumni of The Queen's College, Oxford
Place of birth missing (living people)
ABC News personalities
British Muslims
Year of birth missing (living people)